Smegma (Ancient Greek σμῆγμα : smēgma) Smegma, which is a combination of shed skin cells, skin oils, and moisture, is typically found in individuals who do not regularly shower or wash their genitalia. It can accumulate under the foreskin in males and around the clitoris and labia minora folds in females, affecting both genders.

Females

The accumulation of sebum combined with dead skin cells forms smegma. Smegma clitoridis is defined as the secretion of the apocrine glands of the clitoris, in combination with desquamating epithelial cells. Glands that are located around the clitoris, the labia minora, and the labia majora secrete sebum. 

If smegma is not removed frequently it can lead to clitoral adhesion which can make clitoral stimulation (such as masturbation) painful (clitorodynia).

Males

In males, smegma helps keep the glans moist and facilitates sexual intercourse by acting as a lubricant.

Smegma was originally thought to be produced by sebaceous glands near the frenulum called Tyson's glands; however, subsequent studies have failed to find these glands. Joyce Wright states that smegma is produced from minute microscopic protrusions of the mucosal surface of the foreskin and that living cells constantly grow towards the surface, undergo fatty degeneration, separate off, and form smegma. Parkash et al. found that smegma contains 26.6% fats and 13.3% proteins, which they judged to be consistent with necrotic epithelial debris. 

Newly produced smegma has a smooth, moist texture. It is thought to be rich in squalene and contain prostatic and seminal secretions, desquamated epithelial cells, and the mucin content of the urethral glands of Littré. Smegma contains cathepsin B, lysozymes, chymotrypsin, neutrophil elastase and cytokines, which aid the immune system.

According to Wright, little smegma is produced during childhood, although the foreskin may contain sebaceous glands. She also says that production of smegma increases from adolescence until sexual maturity when the function of smegma for lubrication assumes its full value, and from middle-age production starts to decline and in old age virtually no smegma is produced. Jakob Øster reported that the incidence of smegma increased from 1% among 6- to 9-year-olds to 8% among 14- to 17-year-olds (amongst those who did not present with phimosis and could be examined).

Smegma, itself, is completely benign, but uncircumcised men may develop phimosis, thus increasing the incidence of smegma as well as the risk of penile cancer. There is no evidence that smegma, itself, causes penile cancer, but it may harbor cancerous pathogens, like HPV, and its presence over a long period of time may irritate and inflame the penis, which may increase the risk of cancer. It may also make it harder to see very early cancers.

Other animals
In healthy animals, smegma helps clean and lubricate the genitals. In veterinary medicine, analysis of this smegma is sometimes used for detection of urogenital tract pathogens, such as Tritrichomonas foetus. Accumulation of smegma in the equine preputial folds and the urethral fossa and urethral diverticulum can form large "beans" and promote the carriage of Taylorella equigenitalis, the causative agent of contagious equine metritis. Some equine veterinarians have recommended periodic cleaning of male genitals to improve the health of the animal.

See also
 Keratin pearl
 List of cutaneous conditions
 Mycobacterium smegmatis – found in smegma

References

External links

 
 
 

Excretion
Exocrine system
Mammal female reproductive system
Mammal male reproductive system